aka InoBato is a Japanese light novel series written by Kōta Nozomi with illustrations by 029. SB Creative has published it in thirteen volumes from 2012 to 2018 under their GA Bunko imprint. A manga adaptation with art by Kōsuke Kurose was serialized in Kadokawa Shoten's Comp Ace from September 2013 to February 2015 and compiled in four volumes. A 12-episode anime television series adaptation by Trigger aired in Japan between October 6 and December 22, 2014.

Plot
The story focuses on Senkō High School's Literature Club, whose five members; Jurai, Tomoyo, Hatoko, Sayumi, and Chifuyu, have all somehow developed superpowers. Their superpowers have now become a part of their everyday lives as they battle against others wielding similar powers while struggling through growing up.

Characters

Literature Club members

The main protagonist, who has a notable case of 'chunibyo' (eighth grader syndrome), which he maintains even after getting actual superpowers. As such, he is the one who has given names to everyone's powers, which are each spelled with kanji characters but have English readings.

A red-haired girl who is constantly bemused by Jurai's antics and has feelings for him. It is later revealed that she is trying to become a light-novelist but this is only known to Jurai where he accidentally found out.

A polite airheaded girl who often takes Jurai's chuunibyou antics seriously. She is also Jurai's childhood best friend and has feelings for him as well. She can use these elements simultaneously to create a variety of effects (i.e combining earth and fire to create magma). 

The literature club's president. She is normally seen reading books and appears to have hints of feelings for Ando. Later on, she "awakens" to the ability of returning people and possibly objects to places they have been before.

A fourth year elementary school student who is the adviser's niece. She can also tap into the earth's memory to create matter she has never seen before. She once had a fight with her best friend, Madoka, before she requested Shiharu to help her to make up with her best friend. Also has romantic feelings for Ando.

Others

The student council president who develops her own ability. She initially mistook a letter from Jurai to be a love confession (due to robber and lover having the pronunciation rabā) and falls for him. Even after getting rejected, she remains friends with Jurai.

Tomoyo's older half-brother who left home a year ago. Like Jurai, he is also quite into 'chunibyo'. His ability is "Pinpoint Abyss" which allows him to open up black holes that sucks his opponents in and returning them into their previous location before the meeting without any memories of what has transpired, prior to being a power user, he used to attend college and even has a job.

The second-in-command for Hajime's gang.

She is a fairy assigned to Kiryu's clique, who advises them with all matters pertaining to the fairy wars. Though, small in size, she can be quite a handful when arguing with anyone within the group.

A boy at school who constantly gets dumped by his girls due to his otaku behavior. Despite both enjoying anime, he and Jurai do not get along. It is suggested that he too is a power user who also belongs to Kiryu's clique. However, Kiryu dislikes him for his usurping nature.

Chifuyu's best friend and classmate in elementary school, who she nicknames "Cookie". Madoka once got into a fight with Chifuyu, before Chifuyu requested Shiharu to help her win Madoka as a gift to make up with her. 

The literary club's advisor and Chifuyu's aunt, who often brings Chifuyu to the club due to her busy schedule.

Sayumi's younger sister.

Media

Light novels
The first light novel volume was published on June 16, 2012, by SB Creative under their GA Bunko imprint. The series ended with the release of its 13th volume on January 13, 2018. Digital light novel publisher J-Novel Club are publishing the series in English.

Anime
A 12-episode anime television series adaptation by Trigger aired in Japan between October 6 and December 22, 2014, and was simulcast by Crunchyroll. It is directed by Masahiko Ōtsuka, who also handled series composition. Satoshi Yamaguchi designed the characters and Elements Garden composed the music. The opening theme is "OVERLAPPERS" by Qverktett:II (Haruka Yamazaki, Saori Hayami, Risa Taneda, and Nanami Yamashita) whilst the ending theme is "You Gotta Love Me!" by Kato＊Fuku (Emiri Katō and Kaori Fukuhara). The series has been licensed by Sentai Filmworks in North America.

Notes

References

External links
Official website 
Official anime website 

2012 Japanese novels
Anime and manga based on light novels
GA Bunko
J-Novel Club books
Japanese fantasy novels
Kadokawa Shoten manga
Light novels
Madman Entertainment anime
Romantic comedy anime and manga
Seinen manga
Slice of life anime and manga
Supernatural anime and manga
Sentai Filmworks
Studio Trigger
TV Tokyo original programming